Séraphin "Séra" Martin (2 July 1906 – 23 April 1993) was a French middle-distance runner who set world records in the 800 metres and 1000 metres. He competed at the 1928 and 1932 Olympics and placed sixth and eighth in the 800 metres, respectively.

Career

Martin set a world record at 1000 metres in 1926, running 2:26.8 to break Sven Lundgren's old record of 2:28.6. Two weeks before the 1928 Summer Olympics, Martin ran 800 metres in 1:50.6, breaking Otto Peltzer's world record by a full second. This established him as one of the favourites for the Olympics in Amsterdam. He did make the Olympic final, but was never a major factor in the race and finished sixth in a time of 1:54.6, clearly slower than the 1:53.0 he ran in the semi-finals.

He returned to the Olympics in 1932, placing eighth with a time of 1:53.6. Martin was one of the pacemakers when Jules Ladoumègue set his world record at 1500 metres.

Notes

References

1906 births
1993 deaths
Sportspeople from Nice
French male middle-distance runners
World record setters in athletics (track and field)
Olympic athletes of France
Athletes (track and field) at the 1928 Summer Olympics
Athletes (track and field) at the 1932 Summer Olympics
Pacemakers
20th-century French people